Empress Dowager Xiao (蕭太后) may refer to:

Xiao Wenshou (蕭文壽, 343–423), empress dowager of the Liu Song dynasty
Empress Dowager Xiao (Tang dynasty) (died 847), empress dowager of the Tang dynasty
 Empress Dowager Xiao (Shizong) (died 951), empress dowager of the Liao dynasty, Emperor Shizong's mother
Empress Xiao Yanyan (蕭燕燕, 953–1009), (932–1009), empress dowager of the Liao dynasty, Emperor Shengzong's mother
Empress Dowager Xiao Noujin (蕭耨斤, died 1057), empress dowager of the Liao dynasty, Emperor Xingzong's mother
Empress Dowager Xiao Tali (蕭撻裏, died 1076), empress dowager of the Liao dynasty, Emperor Daozong's mother

See also
Empress Xiao (disambiguation)

Xiao